This article presents a list of the historical events and publications of Australian literature during 1994.

Events 

 Rodney Hall (writer) won the Miles Franklin Award for The Grisly Wife

Major publications

Novels 

 Thea Astley, Coda
 Lily Brett, Just Like That
 Peter Carey (writer), The Unusual Life of Tristan Smith
 Richard Flanagan, Death of a River Guide
 Drusilla Modjeska, The Orchard
 Dorothy Porter, The Monkey's Mask
 John A. Scott, What I Have Written
 Tim Winton, The Riders

Short story anthologies 
 Marian Eldridge, The Wild Sweet Flowers

Children's and young adult fiction 

 Pamela Allen, Clippity-Clop
 Kim Caraher, There's a Bat on the Balcony
 Gary Crew, The Watertower
 Mem Fox, Tough Boris
 Jackie French, Somewhere Around the Corner

Poetry 

 Robert Adamson (poet), Waving to Hart Crane
 Bruce Beaver, Anima and Other Poems
 Peter Boyle (poet), Coming Home from the World
 Dorothy Hewett, Peninsula
 Rhyll McMaster, Flying the Coop: New and selected poems 1972-1994
 Jan Owen, Night Rainbows

Drama 

 Beatrix Christian, Blue Murder
 Michael Gow, Sweet Phoebe
 Hannie Rayson, Falling From Grace
 David Williamson, Sanctuary

Science fiction and fantasy
 Greg Egan, Permutation City

Non-fiction 

 John Birmingham, He Died with a Felafel in His Hand
 Gillian Bouras, Aphrodite and the Others
 Robert Dessaix, A Mother's Disgrace
 Tim Flannery, The Future Eaters
 Jan Ruff O'Herne, Fifty Years of Silence
Susan Varga, Heddy and Me
 Donna Williams, Somebody Somewhere

Awards and honours 

 Patsy Adam-Smith  "for service to community history, particularly through the preservation of national traditions and folklore and recording of oral histories"
 Laurie Hergenhan  "for service to Australian literary scholarship and to education"
 Joan Phipson  "for service to children's literature"
 Judith Rodriguez  "for service to Australian literature, particularly in the area of poetry"

Births 
A list, ordered by date of birth (and, if the date is either unspecified or repeated, ordered alphabetically by surname) of births in 1994 of Australian literary figures, authors of written works or literature-related individuals follows, including year of death.

 18 April — Alexandra Adornetto, actress and author who writes for children and young adults
 25 June — Robbie Coburn, poet and writer

Deaths 
A list, ordered by date of death (and, if the date is either unspecified or repeated, ordered alphabetically by surname) of deaths in 1994 of Australian literary figures, authors of written works or literature-related individuals follows, including year of birth.

 28 January — Frank Hardy, novelist, best known for Power Without Glory (born 1917)
7 February — Rosemary Wighton, literary editor, author and advisor to the South Australian government on women's affairs (born 1925)
 29 May — Nene Gare, writer and artist, best known for The Fringe Dwellers (born 1919)
 16 June — Hugh Atkinson (novelist), novelist, journalist, screenwriter and documentary film maker (born 1924)
 7 September — James Clavell, novelist, screenwriter, director, and World War II veteran and prisoner of war (born 1921)
 16 December — Mary Durack, author and historian (born 1913)

See also 

 1994 in Australia
 1994 in literature
 1994 in poetry
 List of years in literature
 List of years in Australian literature

References 

1994 in Australia
Australian literature by year
20th-century Australian literature
1994 in literature